AFN may refer to:

 Additional funds needed, a financial concept
 Afghan afghani, ISO 4217 currency code
 Air Force Network (AFNET), digital information grid owned by Indian Air Force
 Alaska Federation of Natives
 American Forces Network, broadcasting network operated by the United States Armed Forces
 Assembly of First Nations, in Canada
 Athletics Federation of Nigeria
 Defaka language, a Nigerian language
 Asian Food Network, Southeast Asian pay television channel 
 Afrique française du Nord, French North Africa, a mid 20th-century term encompassing Tunisia, Morocco and Algeria
 AFN Limited, manufacturer of the Frazer Nash automobile
 Nikon AF-N, a type of Nikon F-mount lens